Gilbert Ironside  the younger (1632 – 27 August 1701) was an English churchman and academic, Warden of Wadham College, Oxford, from 1667, Bishop of Bristol and Bishop of Hereford.

Life
He was the third son of Gilbert Ironside the elder, born at Winterbourne Abbas. On 14 November 1650, he matriculated at Wadham College, Oxford, where he graduated BA on 4 February 1653, MA on 22 June 1655, BD on 12 October 1664, and DD on 30 June 1666. He became scholar of his college in 1651, fellow in 1656, and was appointed public reader in grammar in 1659, bursar in 1659 and 1661, sub-warden in 1660, and librarian in 1662. He was presented in 1663 to the rectory of Winterbourne Faringdon by Sir John Miller, with which he held from 1666, in succession to his father, the rectory of Winterbourne Steepleton.

On the promotion of Walter Blandford to the See of Oxford, he was elected Warden of Wadham College on 7 December 1665, an office which he held for 25 years until his resignation on 7 October 1689. According to Anthony Wood, he was strongly opposed to the high-handed John Fell, and refused to serve as Vice-Chancellor of the University of Oxford during Fell's lifetime. After Fell's death in 1686, he filled the office from 1687 to 1689. When King James II made his visit to Oxford in September 1687 with the aim of compelling Magdalen College to admit his nominee Anthony Farmer as President, in a discussion with the King, Ironside insisted on the fellows' rights. He declined in November an invitation to dine with the King's special commissioners on the evening after they had expelled the fellows of Magdalen.

After the Glorious Revolution, Ironside was rewarded for his resistance by being appointed bishop of Bristol; the diocese was poor, and Ironside was consecrated, 13 October 1689, on the understanding that he should be translated to a more lucrative see when opportunity offered. On the death of Herbert Croft, he was transferred to the see of Hereford in July 1691. Near the turn of the century when he was about sixty years of age, according to Wood, Ironside married a widow of Bristol, née Robinson. He died on 27 August 1701, and was buried in the church of St. Mary Somerset, Thames Street, London. On the demolition of that church in 1867, the bishop's remains were transferred to Hereford Cathedral.

Works
Ironside published, with a short preface, Nicholas Ridley's account of a disputation at Oxford on the sacrament, together with a letter of John Bradford's (Oxford, 1688), and a sermon preached before the king on 23 November 1684 (Oxford, 1685). A portrait is in the hall of Wadham College.

References

Sources

1632 births
1701 deaths
People from Dorset
Alumni of Wadham College, Oxford
Fellows of Wadham College, Oxford
Wardens of Wadham College, Oxford
Vice-Chancellors of the University of Oxford
Bishops of Bristol
Bishops of Hereford
Burials at Hereford Cathedral
17th-century Church of England bishops
17th-century Anglican theologians
18th-century Anglican theologians